Queen is the fourth studio album by rapper Nicki Minaj. It was released on August 10, 2018, through Young Money Entertainment, Cash Money Records and Republic Records. It is Minaj's first album in nearly four years, following The Pinkprint (2014). She started recording the album in late 2016 and finished in August 2018 and collaborated with a handful of producers to reach her desired sound.  It features guest appearances by rappers Eminem, Foxy Brown, Future, Swae Lee, and Lil Wayne; and singers Ariana Grande, Labrinth, and the Weeknd.

The album's release date was delayed before ultimately being released a week ahead of schedule. It was supported by the singles:  "Chun-Li", "Bed", "Barbie Dreams" and a remix of "Good Form". To further promote the album's release, Minaj launched her own radio show, titled Queen Radio, which aired on Beats 1, made several television appearances and live performances, and began The Nicki Wrld Tour in February 2019.

Queen received generally positive reviews from music critics, who praised the production but derided the album's length and lack of direction. It debuted at number two on the US Billboard 200 with 185,000 album-equivalent units, of which 78,000 came from pure album sales. It charted within the top ten in other music markets, such as Australia, Canada, Netherlands, Ireland, New Zealand, Norway, Switzerland, and the United Kingdom. The album was certified platinum by the RIAA in January 2019.

Background and development
Following the release of her third studio album The Pinkprint in 2014 and the end of The Pinkprint Tour in August 2015, Minaj went into Hot 97's Ebro in the Morning in October 2016, where she was asked for details about her upcoming album, responding, "The album is so freaking epic, but it's a journey right. Before my first album came out, I was on everybody's song; I had my own campaign without realizing it. Right now, I have to complete a few things for other people." During following interviews Minaj claimed her fourth studio album would be her "best body of work", "a classic hip-hop album that people will never forget," and an era "a billion times more epic than anything 'Anaconda' could have delivered."

In October 2017, Minaj opened up for T Magazine about her vision for the album. "Sonically, I know what the album's about to sound like," she said, "I know what this album is gonna mean to my fans. This album is everything in my life coming full circle. [...] Now, I can tell you guys what happened for the last two years of my life. I know who I am. I am getting Nicki Minaj figured out with this album and I'm loving her."

Music and lyrics

Queen is a hip hop album that also contains elements of trap, dancehall, reggae, pop, and R&B. The opening track "Ganja Burn" is a reggae-inspired island-pop song, in which Minaj defends her position in the music industry. The following track "Majesty", with Labrinth featuring Eminem, is a pop-rap song that "sinks under dated piano chords, melodramatic string swells and a grating vocal hook." The third track, "Barbie Dreams", samples the Notorious B.I.G.'s 1994 song "Just Playing (Dreams)". While the Notorious B.I.G. rapped about his sexual desire for popular R&B singers, Minaj roasts male artists, including Drake, ex-boyfriend Meek Mill, Eminem, DJ Khaled, 50 Cent, Young Thug, Swae Lee, Lil Uzi Vert, Fetty Wap, Quavo, Desiigner, Future, and YG. Minaj clarified that the track only targets individuals she loves, and claimed it is not actually a diss track.

"Rich Sex", featuring Lil Wayne, is a trap song, in contrast to R&B song "Thought I Knew You" which "sports some of Queens lushest production". In "Thought I Knew You", the Weeknd, a featured artist on the track, contribute to the lament over estranged lovers with Weeknd's "buttery tenor serving as the perfect counterpoint to [Minaj's] clipped, Auto-Tuned raps and distorted vocals." Swae Lee, of hip hop duo Rae Sremmurd, is also featured on the album. Brendan Klinkenberg of Rolling Stone opines that Lee steals the spotlight on this track with his "delicate falsetto" with Minaj "deploying clearly demarcated, darting verses." Minaj named their song "Chun Swae" after her collaborator. At the end of this track, Minaj boasts to her listeners "You're in the middle of Queen right now, thinking/I see why she called this shit Queen/This bitch is really the fucking queen—ahh!" before bursting into a maniacal laugh.

The album's lead single, "Chun-Li" follows immediately. "Sir", featuring Future, was one of two tracks added after the other 17 songs in the album. Variety described "Come See About Me" as "a soft, sculpted ballad that allows Minaj's rap-singing romanticism to nestle in a richly opulent setting." Foxy Brown is featured in the track "Coco Chanel". Andree Gee from Uproxx asserted that their collaboration in the "swaggering" track remained "true to both rapper's Trini roots, with dancehall inspired drums fused over ominous keys." The song continues into the closing track "Inspirations Outro".

Release and promotion 
On May 7, 2018, during an interview at the Met Gala, Minaj announced the album's title and original release date, which was then delayed. It was initially scheduled for a June 15 release, but was later pushed back to August 10, and then to August 17, before ultimately being released a week ahead of schedule.

To accompany the album's release, Minaj launched her own radio show titled Queen Radio, which aired on Beats 1. The radio show started August 9, 2018 and the most recent show aired on February 10, 2020. The show featured celebrity guest appearances by Ariana Grande, Alicia Keys, Winnie Harlow, Kim Kardashian, Kelly Rowland, Swae Lee, Little Mix, Lil Wayne, Nene Leakes, Normani, Kandi Burruss, Lauren London, Kehlani, Tyga, Trina, Asian Doll, Cassie, Soulja Boy, Blac Chyna, Big Fendi, Joe Budden and Ts Madison. The show usually began with Minaj reading fans' tweets. Throughout the show, Minaj played a mixture of songs from her own playlist as well as some tracks from the album. Additionally, Minaj gave advice to callers about their sex lives.

Minaj made several television appearances and live performances in support of the album. On May 13, 2018, Minaj performed "Chun-Li" live during Future's set at Rolling Loud Festival in Miami. She also performed the song during her Saturday Night Live season finale appearance on May 19, 2018. On June 23, 2018, she performed a medley of "Chun-Li" and "Rich Sex" at the BET Awards. On August 13, 2018, she appeared as a guest on The Late Show, and freestyled a personalized verse from "Barbie Dreams" dedicated to Stephen Colbert. On August 20, 2018, she performed a medley of "Majesty", "Barbie Dreams", "Ganja Burn", and "Fefe" live from the PATH World Trade Center station at the 2018 MTV Video Music Awards. On November 4, 2018, Minaj performed her song "Good Form" and "Woman Like Me" with Little Mix in Spain at the 2018 MTV Europe Music Awards. On November 11, 2018, Minaj performed "Good Form" and "Dip" with Tyga at the 44th People's Choice Awards where Queen won the fan-voted award for the Album of 2018.

Merchandise and tour bundles were sold with the album. Further promotion included a co-headlining NickiHndrxx Tour with American rapper Future. However, it was announced on December 21, 2018 that Future was no longer part of the tour and Minaj would tour with late American rapper Juice Wrld instead; The Nicki Wrld Tour commenced in February 2019 in Europe.

Artwork and packaging

On June 7, 2018, Minaj released the cover art for the album on Twitter, shot by Mert and Marcus during the "Ganja Burn" music video shoot, which featured Minaj topless, sitting on a log. She wears pasties and a head-dress inspired by the ancient Egyptian queen Cleopatra.

Singles
"Chun-Li" was released on April 12, 2018 as the first single alongside "Barbie Tingz". As the lead single from the album, a vertical music video was released on April 13, while the official video, directed by Steven Klein, was uploaded onto Minaj's YouTube and Vevo accounts on May 4. It peaked at number ten on the US Billboard Hot 100 and number six on the Hot R&B/Hip-Hop Songs chart; and was certified platinum by the Recording Industry Association of America (RIAA). "Barbie Tingz" appears on the Target Exclusive edition of the album and as a bonus track in Japan. Its music video, directed by Giovanni Bianco, was uploaded to Minaj's YouTube and Vevo accounts on May 4. The song peaked at number 25 on the Billboard Hot 100 and number 17 on the Hot R&B/Hip-Hop Songs chart, and was certified gold by the Recording Industry Association of America.

"Bed", featuring American singer Ariana Grande, was released as the album's second single on June 14 along with the album pre-order, and was later serviced to contemporary hit radio and rhythmic contemporary radio in the United States on June 19. Its music video, directed by Hype Williams, premiered on July 6 on Minaj's YouTube and Vevo accounts. The song peaked at number 42 on the Billboard Hot 100 and number 19 on the Hot R&B/Hip-Hop Songs chart and was certified gold by the RIAA.

"Barbie Dreams" was released as the album's third single and serviced to rhythmic contemporary radio in the United States on August 14. The music video for the song was released on September 11 and was directed by Hype Williams. It peaked at number 18 on the Billboard Hot 100 and number 13 on the Hot R&B/Hip-Hop Songs chart and was certified gold by the RIAA. "Majesty", featuring Eminem and Labrinth, and "Good Form" were scheduled to be serviced to radio as singles on October 16 and November 13, respectively. Only the latter was released, with a remix featuring American rapper Lil Wayne, being serviced as the album's fourth single with an accompanying music video, directed by Colin Tilley, on November 29. It peaked at number 60 on the Billboard Hot 100 and number 29 on the Hot R&B/Hip-Hop songs chart.

Promotional singles
"Rich Sex" featuring American rapper Lil Wayne was released on June 11, 2018 as a promotional single from the album. It peaked at number 56 on the Billboard Hot 100 and number 24 on the Hot R&B/Hip-Hop Songs chart.

Other songs
"Ganja Burn", the opening track of the album, was supported by a music video directed by Mert and Marcus, released on August 13. The song peaked at number 60 on the Billboard Hot 100 and number 27 on the Hot R&B/Hip-Hop Songs chart. "Hard White" was also supported by a music video released on February 1, 2019. Minaj announced the release of the video a day earlier on Instagram along with the announcement of her Queen Fragrance.

"Fefe" by American rapper 6ix9ine featuring Minaj and Murda Beatz was released on July 22, along with its accompanying music video, directed by TrifeDrew and William Asher. It peaked at number three on both Billboard Hot 100 and the Hot R&B/Hip-Hop Songs chart and was certified 8× Platinum by the Recording Industry Association of America. "Fefe" was added to the tracklist days after the album release as track number 20, and only appears in the standard digital edition.

Critical reception

Queen was met with generally positive reviews from critics, who praised the production but derided the length and general lack of direction. At Metacritic, which assigns a normalized rating out of 100 to reviews from mainstream publications, the album received an average score of 70, based on 22 reviews.

In a positive review, Ella Jukwey of The Independent wrote that Queen is "the most important album of Minaj's career so far. It's the first time in her career that she has faced real opposition, and this latest record suggests that competition brings out the best in her. It may lack cohesion at certain points, but one thing is never in doubt: Minaj is still one of the best in her field." Reviewing for Vice, Robert Christgau said Minaj's album and Eminem's 2018 Kamikaze record are "quick-lipped, sharp-tongued arguments for the hip-hop they and I came up on and the endangered kind of flow both excel at. And both are funny, outrageous, self-confident announcements that neither artist has any intention of going away."

For Billboard, Kathy Iandoli stated that Queen "exists to exemplify Nicki's proven longevity, which is enough of a rarity to finally declare her as well-deserved rap royalty", although was critical of the album's length. Briana Younger of Pitchfork gave the album a positive review, stating "the connections between past and present, between style and form, make Queen feel like her most creatively honest album." Erin Lowers from Exclaim! gave the album a positive review, saying it highlighted the rapper's "ability to adapt to an ever-changing sonic landscape" and concluding that Minaj wasn't going anywhere anytime soon. The A.V. Club gave it a B+, stating in their review, "Musically, she avoids flavor-of-the-moment trend-hopping in favor of lusher, more broadly poppy production [...] it's a lot of fun, but not quite the instant classic for which Minaj seems to have been aiming."

In a mixed review, Bryan Rolli of Forbes concluded that Queen is "a great 10-song album hiding inside a messy 19-song album", though complimented Minaj's lyricism, and said the album "gives fans plenty to sink their teeth into." Mikael Wood of the Los Angeles Times, felt that Minaj "spends so much time describing her dominance that a clear conclusion is that she fears it's beginning to erode [...] all the back-in-my-day stuff suggests a lack of confidence in her unique perspective." For The Washington Post, Chris Richards said, "Queen only feels connected to the current rap zeitgeist in the saddest way, as another portrait of a visionary rapper in decline." Carl Anka of NME wrote, "Unfortunately, in trying to take on all comers at once, there are parts of Queen that feel like an overreach. There is a better ten track effort hiding in Queen, but you get the impression Nicki kept tracks like 'Miami' to hedge her bets in a bid for streaming success." Mosi Reeves of Rolling Stone wrote that Queen brings a new Nicki Minaj character: "the regal, haughty monarch, a woman who insists on sword-sharpened rhymes as a prerogative for excellence" but taking note of the "flabby, meandering mid-section."

In an unfavorable review, The Hollywood Reporters Jonny Coleman deemed the album "[a] joyless mess" and summarized, "Minaj doesn't really investigate any of her issues with herself or others in any meaningful way on the new album. When all is said and done, it's just another playlist of disconnected mish-mash bangers that we'll probably forget in two weeks." The Atlantics Spencer Kornhaber criticized the lyrical content of "Hard White", describing it as sexist and undermining Minaj's feminist position. Online hip hop publication HipHopDX criticised the album for a lack of depth and its run time, saying: "There are no deep layers to be uncovered on Queen."

Commercial performance
In the United States, the album debuted at number two on the Billboard 200 with 185,000 album-equivalent units, of which 78,000 were from pure album sales. The album debuted behind Astroworld by American rapper Travis Scott, which spent a second week on top. The album dropped one place to number three in its second week, earning an additional 95,000 album-equivalent units. The album dropped to the number five position on the Billboard chart in the third week, moving 64,000 equivalent units. In the fourth week, Queen slipped from the number five to seven position on the Billboard charts, moving 47,000 equivalent-units. In January 2019, Queen was certified Platinum by the Recording Industry Association of America (RIAA) for 1 million equivalent units in the US.

In Australia, Queen opened at number four on the ARIA Albums Chart, becoming Minaj's highest charting album in the country. In Canada, the album debuted at number two on the Canadian Albums Chart, behind Scott's Astroworld. It serves as Minaj's fourth consecutive top-ten album in the country. In the United Kingdom, Queen debuted at number five on the UK Albums Chart, becoming the rapper's second top-ten album on the chart. The album also reached the top ten in other music markets, such as Ireland, the Netherlands, New Zealand, Norway, Switzerland and Wallonia. Queen is also Minaj's highest peaking album in France and Germany, where it debuted at number seven and eighteen respectively.

Accolades

Track listing

Notes
  signifies a co-producer.
  signifies an additional producer.
 "Ganja Burn" was incorrectly titled as "Ganja Burns" upon release
 "Fefe" was added halfway through Queen's first week

Sample credits
 "Barbie Dreams" contains interpolations from "Just Playing (Dreams)", written by Christopher Wallace and Rashad Smith, as performed by The Notorious B.I.G.; samples and interpolations from "Blues & Pants", written by James Brown and Fred Wesley, as performed by Brown
 "Coco Chanel" and "Inspirations (Outro)" contain elements and samples from "Bun Up the Dance", written by Dillon Hart Francis and Sonny Moore, as performed by Dillon Francis and Skrillex

Personnel
Credits adapted from Queen album liner notes.

Musicians

 Nicki Minaj – main vocals 
 6ix9ine – main vocals 
 Murda Beatz – lead artist 
 Labrinth – main vocals 
 Eminem – featured vocals 
 Lil Wayne – featured vocals 
 Ariana Grande – featured vocals 
 The Weeknd – featured vocals 
 Swae Lee – featured vocals 
 Future – featured vocals 
 Foxy Brown – featured vocals 
 Douglas Patterson – additional vocals 
 Jairus Mozee – guitars 
 Luis Resto – additional keyboards 
 OP! – additional programming

Production

 Dwayne "Tha President" Carter – executive production
 Bryan "Baby Birdman" Williams – executive production
 Ronald "Slim tha Don" Williams – executive production
 Nicki Minaj – co-executive production, co-production 
 Jenny Beal – album production
 Michelle Ayabarreno – album production
 J. Reid – production 
 Labrinth – production 
 Rashad "Ringo" Smith – production 
 Mel and Mus – production 
 Boi-1da – production 
 Illmind – production 
 Ben Billions – production 
 Beats Bailey – production 
 Dwayne "Supa Dups" Chin-Quee – production 
 Sevn Thomas – production 
 Rex Kudo – production 
 Metro Boomin – production 
 Sool – production 
 DJ Wes – production 
 JFK – production 
 Mike Will Made It – production 
 Pluss – production 
 JMIKE – production 
 June Nawakii – production 
 Kane Beatz – production 
 J Gramm – production 
 Frank Dukes – production 
 Christopher Braide – production 
 Henry "Cirkut" Walter – production 
 Zaytoven – production 
 Murda Beatz – production 
 J Beatzz – production 
 Invincible – production 
 Messy – co-production 
 Ashley "Blank" Bannister – co-production 
 Cubeatz – co-production 
 Lowkey – co-production 
 Eminem – additional production 
 Aubry "Big Juice" Delaine – additional production

Technical

 Aubry "Big Juice" Delaine – record engineering , mixing 
 Labrinth – record engineering 
 Mike Strange – record engineering 
 Joe Strange – record engineering 
 Jeff Edwards – record engineering 
 Manny Galvez – record engineering 
 Shin Kamiyama – record engineering 
 Randy Lanphaer – record engineering 
 Swae Lee – record engineering 
 Jeremy Reid – record engineering 
 Wizard Lee Weinberg – record engineering , mixing , mastering engineering 
 Laura Bates – record engineering assistance , mixing assistance 
 Iván Jiménez – record engineering assistance , mixing assistance 
 Brian Judd – record engineering assistance 
 Nick Valentin – record engineering assistance 
 Alex Estevez – record engineering assistance 
 Todd Bergman – record engineering assistance 
 Jamal Berry – record engineering assistance 
 Jason Delattiboudere – record engineering assistance 
 Ludovick Tartavel – record engineering assistance 
 Yann Bordeo – record engineering assistance 
 Iain Findlay – record engineering assistance 
 Jordon Silva – record engineering assistance 
 William Knauft – record engineering assistance 
 Cory Williams – record engineering assistance 
 Matthew Sim – record engineering assistance 
 Jason Staniulis – record engineering assistance 
 Kenta Yonesaka – record engineering assistance 
 Shane Goodridge – record engineering assistance 
 Jaycen Joshua – mixing 
 Eminem – mixing 
 Mike Strange – mixing 
 Serban Ghenea – mixing 
 Jon Castelli – mixing 
 John Hanes – mixing engineering 
 Ingmar Carlson – mixing engineering 
 Josh Deguzman – mixing engineering 
 David Nakaji – mixing assistance 
 Ben Milchev – mixing assistance 
 Jacob Richards – mixing assistance 
 Rashawn Mclean – mixing assistance 
 Mike Seaberg – mixing assistance 
 Chris Athens – mastering 
 Brian "Big Bass" Gardner – mastering

Artwork

 Marcus Piggott – photography
 Mert Alas – photography
 Jenna Marsh – creative direction
 Joe Perez – creative direction
 Katie McIntyre – type design, art direction assistance
 Allen Chiu – type design drawing

Charts

Weekly charts

Year-end charts

Certifications

Release history

See also
 List of UK R&B Albums Chart number ones of 2018

References

External links
 
 Did It On Em Socks

2018 albums
Nicki Minaj albums
Albums produced by Boi-1da
Albums produced by Cirkut
Albums produced by Eminem
Albums produced by Frank Dukes
Albums produced by Illmind
Albums produced by Kane Beatz
Albums produced by Labrinth
Albums produced by Metro Boomin
Albums produced by Mike Will Made It
Albums produced by Murda Beatz
Albums produced by Rashad Smith
Albums produced by Supa Dups
Albums produced by Zaytoven
Albums produced by Cubeatz
Young Money Entertainment albums
Cash Money Records albums
Republic Records albums